Hopea oblongifolia is a species of plant in the family Dipterocarpaceae. It is found in Myanmar and Thailand.

References

oblongifolia
Data deficient plants
Taxonomy articles created by Polbot